The Civil Engineering Database (CEDB) was created in 1994, and is maintained by American Society of Civil Engineers (ASCE). It is a free bibliographic database, containing 270,000-entries, for all ASCE publications including journals, conference proceedings, books, standards, manuals, magazines, and newspapers on all the disciplines of civil engineering. The coverage dates back to 1872.

See also
List of academic databases and search engines

References

Civil engineering
American Society of Civil Engineers